Andrew Aitkenhead (March 6, 1904 — October 21, 1968) was a Scottish-born Canadian ice hockey goaltender for the New York Rangers of the National Hockey League between 1932 and 1934. Born in Glasgow, Aitkenhead came to Canada as a young child with his family, and grew up in Yorkton, Saskatchewan.

Playing career
Andy Aitkenkead played ten years in various minor leagues in Western Canada, most notably appearing in the 1923 Memorial Cup with the Saskatoon Quakers. After turning pro, Aitkenhead took two teams to the Allan Cup finals, the Saskatoon Nationals and the Saskatoon Empires, in 1924 and 1926 respectively.

Originally taken by the Rangers in the Inter-league draft from the Saskatoon Shieks in 1928, his rights were sent back and forth between the Rangers and the Portland Buckaroos of the PCHL,  until he finally signed with the Rangers as a free agent in 1931.   He made his debut for the Rangers on November 10, 1932, at the Montreal Forum against the Montreal Maroons. He won the job as starting goaltender for the Rangers from John Ross Roach, who had twice led the team to the Stanley Cup Final.  In his first two seasons in New York, Aitkenhead played in every single game for the Rangers,  and he put up solid numbers.  In his first season in New York, Aitkenhead was fourth in the league in goals against average, as well as fourth in wins.   In that rookie season, he led the Rangers to the Stanley Cup, their second, in 1933.  He posted a shutout in the clinching game, in overtime, against the Toronto Maple Leafs.  The following season, Aitkenhead finished fifth overall in goals against, yet second in wins, and third in shutouts,  however the Rangers were eliminated by the Maroons in the opening round of the playoffs.   In 1935 Aitkenhead struggled, and eventually lost the starting job to Dave Kerr.  He played only 10 games that season.  Kerr later said that Aitkenhead's obsession with his game were what got to him, and led to his departure from the NHL.   After 1935 Andy Aitkenhead was returned to the minor leagues. Aitkenhead spent 6 seasons with the Portland Buckaroos of the PCHL before retiring from hockey in 1941.

Legacy
In the 2009 book 100 Ranger Greats, the authors ranked Aitkenhead at No. 97 all-time of the 901 New York Rangers who had played during the team's first 82 seasons.

Aitkenhead was inducted into the Oregon Sports Hall of Fame in 1987.

Career statistics

Regular season and playoffs

See also
List of National Hockey League players born in the United Kingdom

References

External links

1904 births
1968 deaths
Bronx Tigers players
Canadian ice hockey goaltenders
Ice hockey people from Saskatchewan
Naturalized citizens of Canada
New York Rangers players
Philadelphia Arrows players
Portland Buckaroos players
Saskatoon Sheiks players
British emigrants to Canada
Seattle Seahawks (ice hockey) players
Spokane Clippers players
Sportspeople from Glasgow
Sportspeople from Yorkton
Springfield Indians players
Stanley Cup champions
Canadian expatriate ice hockey players in the United States